Laurel School District is a name shared by several school districts in the United States.

 Laurel School District (Delaware) of Laurel, Delaware
 Laurel School District (Mississippi) of Laurel, Mississippi
 Laurel School District (Pennsylvania) of Lawrence County, Pennsylvania

Also:
 Laurel County School District, in London, Kentucky